The Cellairis Amphitheatre at Lakewood is a concert venue located in Atlanta, which opened in 1989. The amphitheatre seats 18,920 (7,000 seated; 12,000 on the lawn). It was designed to offer a state-of-the-art musical experience for both music fans and artists. The venue was built specifically for popular music.

Notable details
The amphitheatre is located approximately 4 miles south of downtown Atlanta, at the Lakewood Fairgrounds. Phish, among others, have called the amphitheatre one of their favorite venues to play at, due to the quality of the acoustics rarely found at lower-level roofed amphitheatres. Linkin Park used their performance of "One Step Closer" from Projekt Revolution 2004 on their LPU 4 CD and also used their performance of "The Little Things Give You Away" from Projekt Revolution 2007 on their LPU 7 CD. In 2008, the Verizon Wireless Amphitheatre at Encore Park opened in Alpharetta, Georgia, an affluent suburb on the north side of Atlanta. This gave Metro Atlanta another premier outdoor venue along with Lakewood, Chastain Park Amphitheater in Buckhead/Sandy Springs and the Frederick Brown Jr Amphitheater on the south side in Peachtree City.

History of name changes 
The venue opened on 14 July 1989, as the Coca-Cola Lakewood Amphitheatre and retained that name until 1999, when the name was changed to Lakewood Amphitheatre. In 2001, the venue became known as HiFi Buys Amphitheatre. As of the 2008 season, the venue was once again known as Lakewood Amphitheatre, due to HiFi Buys filing for bankruptcy in 2007.  The facility utilized a logo similar to the one used before the name-change to HiFi Buys Amphitheatre. In May 2009, a naming-rights agreement was formed with Aaron's, and the venue was called Aaron's Amphitheatre at Lakewood. In January 2016 the venue went back to its classic name of Lakewood Amphitheatre. In November 2017, Cellairis, a cell phone accessories company, signed naming rights to sponsor the venue and it officially became Cellairis Amphitheatre at Lakewood.

Concerts
The following artists have performed at Lakewood Amphitheater:
Bon Jovi - July 20, 1989
Tom Petty and the Heartbreakers - August 4, 1989
The Who - August 7-August 9, 1989
Elton John - September 16–17, 1989
Nitzer Ebb and Depeche Mode - June 4, 1990
Crosby, Stills, Nash & Young - June 22, 1990
Fleetwood Mac and Squeeze - June 23, 1990
Eric Clapton - July 28, 1990
Phil Collins - September 2, 1990
Van Morrison - September 4, 1990
Bell Biv DeVoe - April 8, 1991
Yes - July 9, 1991
Van Halen - August 16, 1991
Sting - September 21, 1991
Rod Stewart - October 17, 1991
The Beach Boys - June 19, 1992
Crosby, Stills, Nash & Young - July 5, 1992
Elton John - August 12, 1992
Red Hot Chili Peppers and Ministry - August 20, 1992
Metallica- August 31, 1992
Red Hot Chili Peppers and Ministry - September 1, 1992
Bon Jovi - July 17, 1993
Duran Duran and Terence Trent D'Arby - July 20, 1993
Stone Temple Pilots - August 10, 1993
Jethro Tull - August 23, 1993
Def Leppard - September 11, 1993
Aerosmith - October 2, 1993
Phil Collins - June 4, 1994
Depeche Mode - June 9, 1994
Crosby, Stills, Nash & Young - June 24, 1994
The Smashing Pumpkins - August 13, 1994
Fleetwood Mac - August 18, 1994
Aerosmith - September 2, 1994
Stone Temple Pilots - September 3, 1994
Tom Petty and the Heartbreakers and Pete Droge - April 15, 1995
Phish - June 15, 1995
Queensrÿche and Type O Negative - June 28, 1995
Elton John - September 1–2, 1995
Tom Petty and the Heartbreakers and Pete Droge - September 30, 1995
Jeff Beck and Santana - October 3, 1995
Nine Inch Nails - October 9, 1995
Crosby, Stills, Nash & Young and Chicago - May 22, 1996
Sting - June 28, 1996
Gloria Estefan - July 18 & 19, 1996
Neil Young, Jewel, and Ben Folds Five - August 10, 1996
Scorpions and Alice Cooper - August 12, 1996
Def Leppard - August 16, 1996
The Cure - September 6, 1996
Dave Matthews Band - September 7, 1996
Tina Turner and Cyndi Lauper - June 14, 1997
Kansas and Emerson, Lake, and Palmer - June 16, 1997
Eels, Korn, Tool, Jane's Addiction, Snoop Dogg, Tricky, and The Prodigy - June 27, 1997
Phish - July 23, 1997
Rage Against the Machine, Wu-Tang Clan, and Atari Teenage Riot - August 10, 1997
The Who - August 13, 1997
Mary J. Blige, Bone Thugs-N-Harmony, Dru Hill, Ginuwine, and Aaliyah - September 10, 1997
Aerosmith - September 12, 1997
Fleetwood Mac - November 15, 1997
Elton John - May 8–9, 1998
Spice Girls - June 18, 1998
Hanson - July 5, 1998
Backstreet Boys - July 12, 1998
Van Halen - July 31, 1998
Phish - August 6, 1998
Dave Matthews Band - August 20, 1998
Mudhoney and Pearl Jam - September 1, 1998
Beastie Boys, Rancid, and DJ Hurricane - September 2, 1998
Aerosmith - September 5, 1998
Janet Jackson and Usher - September 16, 1998
Shania Twain - September 26, 1998
Aerosmith - October 3, 1998
Poison and Ratt - July 2, 1999
Phish - July 3–4, 1999
Dave Matthews Band - July 28, 1999
Mötley Crüe and Scorpions, - August 25, 1999
The Goo Goo Dolls - September 2, 1999
Rick Springfield - September 10, 1999
Lenny Kravitz and Pink - September 21, 1999
Tom Petty and the Heartbreakers - September 24, 1999
The Cure - May 18, 2000
A Perfect Circle and Nine Inch Nails - May 20, 2000
Blink-182, Bad Religion, and Fenix TX - May 21, 2000
Red Hot Chili Peppers - June 8, 2000
James Brown - June 10, 2000
Ozzfest - July 4, 2000
Poison and The Go-Go's - July 18, 2000
Santana - July 22, 2000
Kansas and Yes - July 30, 2000
Metallica and Corrosion of Conformity - August 5, 2000
Megadeth and Mötley Crüe - August 25, 2000
Beastie Boys - September 1, 2000
Sting - September 5, 2000
Dave Matthews Band - September 10, 2000
Britney Spears - September 18, 2000
Christina Aguilera and Destiny's Child - September 20, 2000
Everclear, Green Day, Stroke 9, Eve 6, Papa Roach, and Stone Temple Pilots - October 1, 2000
Counting Crows - October 14, 2000
Poison - May 31, 2000
Dido - June 20, 2001
Styx, Bad Company, Billy Squier, and Joe Stark - June 21, 2001
Depeche Mode - June 9, 2001
Tom Petty and the Heartbreakers and Jackson Browne - June 14, 2001
Allman brothers band, Phil Lesh & Friends, and Susan Tedeschi - August 5, 2001
Aerosmith and Fuel - September 17, 2001
99X Big Day Out- September 21–22, 2001
Blink-182, Green Day, and Jimmy Eat World - May 18, 2002
Deep Purple, Dio, and Scorpions - June 19, 2002
Jamie O'Neal, Kenny Chesney, Montgomery Gentry, and Phil Vassar - July 3, 2002
Dave Matthews Band and North Mississippi Allstars - July 8, 2002
Sheryl Crow - July 11, 2002
Ozzfest - July 28, 2002
The Strokes and Weezer - July 29, 2002
Tiger Army and New Found Glory - August 1, 2002
Lenny Kravitz - August 8, 2002
Incubus - October 18, 2002
Pearl Jam April 19, 2003 (It was recorded as one of the bootlegs you can download or order on vinyl from their website)
Keith Urban and Kenny Chesney - July 3, 2003
Brooks & Dunn, Rascal Flatts, Brad Paisley, and Jeff Bates - July 25, 2003
Lollapalooza- August 3, 2002
Poison - August 6, 2003
O.A.R. and N.E.R.D - August 29, 2003
Dave Matthews Band - September 20, 2003
Blake Shelton and Toby Keith - October 3, 2003
Supergrass and Radiohead - October 6, 2003
Styx, Peter Frampton, and Nelson - June 16, 2004
Tim Mcgraw - June 17, 2004
Kenny Chesney and Rascal Flatts - July 23, 2004
Puddle of Mudd - July 24, 2004
Dave Matthews Band - July 27, 2004
Warped Tour - July 28, 2004
Rush - August 1, 2004
Alanis Morissette - August 5, 2004
Projekt Revolution - August 13, 2004
Brooks & Dunn, Gretchen Wilson, and  Montgomery Gentry - October 24, 2004
Blake Shelton, Leeann Rimes, and Rascal Flatts - May 21, 2005
Good Charlotte - May 27, 2005
Dave Matthews Band - July 13, 2005
Fall Out Boy - August 3, 2005
Avril Lavigne - August 19, 2005
Oasis, Jet, and Kasabian - September 27, 2005
Big & Rich and Brooks & Dunn - October 28, 2005
Nine Inch Nails, TV on the Radio, and Bauhaus - June 7, 2006
The Unholy Alliance Tour - June 27, 2006
Drive-By Truckers, The Black Crowes, and Robert Randolph and the Family Band - July 6, 2006
Dave Matthews Band and Pat Green - August 15, 2006
Mary J. Blige - August 27, 2006
Godsmack and Rob Zombie - August 30, 2006
Counting Crows - September 3, 2006
Tom Petty and the Heartbreakers - September 22, 2006
Crossfade and Staind - September 30, 2006
Brooks & Dunn - November 10, 2006
Satellite Party and Chris Cornell - June 2, 2007
Fall Out Boy, The Academy Is..., Cobra Starship, Paul Wall, and +44 - June 14, 2007
Warped Tour - July 18, 2007
Wu-Tang Clan and Pharoahe Monch - August 2, 2007
Miranda Lambert - August 9, 2007
Family Values Tour - August 11, 2007
Alan Jackson, Brooks & Dunn, and Jake Owen - August 26, 2007
Ratt, Poison, and Vains of Jenna - September 3, 2007
Kenny Chesney, Pat Green, and Sugarland - September 7–8, 2007
Brad Paisley, Rodney Atkins, and Taylor Swift - September 20, 2007
Velvet Revolver, Alice in Chains, and Sparta - October 3, 2007
Maroon 5, Counting Crows, and Augustana - January 10, 2008
Liars and Radiohead - May 8, 2008
RBD - September 24, 2023

See also
 List of contemporary amphitheatres
Live Nation

References

External links

Lakewood Amphitheater

Amphitheaters in the United States
Music venues in Atlanta
Tourist attractions in Atlanta